The horehound bug (Agonoscelis rutila) is a stink bug which sucks the sap of the horehound plant, causing wilting of new shoots. They have five nymphal stages in their development. Although they usually attack horehound, they may also swarm on a variety of other trees and shrubs.

References

Additional photos

Pentatomidae
Insects described in 1776
Hemiptera of Australia